Ave Barrera (born 1980) is a Mexican writer. She was born and raised in Guadalajara. She studied Spanish literature at the University of Guadalajara; she has also studied at Complutense University in Madrid. She has worked as an editor, copywriter and ghostwriter.

As an author, she has published short stories, novels and children's books. Her debut novel Puertas demasiado pequeñas won the Sergio Galindo Award from Veracruz University. It was translated into English by Robin Myers and Ellen Jones, and published by Charco Press.

Other novels include Tratado de la vida marina and Restauración. Her short stories have appeared in anthologies such as Río entre las piedras and El hambre heroica.

She lives in México City.

References

Living people
1980 births
Mexican women writers
Writers from Guadalajara, Jalisco
University of Guadalajara alumni
Complutense University of Madrid alumni